Karaeng Matoaya (1573–1636) was the ruler of Tallo and the bicara-butta (first minister) of Gowa from 1593 until his death. He gained power after overthrowing Tunipasuluq, and transformed Makassar into one of the main trading centre in Eastern Indonesia. He converted to Islam around 1605, adopted an Islamic name "Abdullah Awwal al-Islam" and the Islamization of Gowa and Tallo subsequently happened under his influence.

Biography 
On the eve of Friday September 22, 1605 Karaeng Matoaya took the shahada and converted to Islam. Karaeng Matoaya was described as a pious Muslim by the Chronicle of Goa and Talloq, and was said to have followed all the prescriptions of Muslim law. Two years later, the people of Goa had all been converted to Islam.

Three years after converting to Islam Matoaya sent an envoy to his brother, King of Bone, and asked him to perform the shahada and profess himself a Muslim. However, the request was firmly rejected by the King of Bone. Upon hearing this Matoaya launched the Islamic wars, also called the bunduq kasallannganga, against the neighboring non-Muslim kingdoms to force them to accept Islam. The wars resulted in the conversion of the entirety of southwest Sulawesi, with Bone being converted in 1611. While religion played a significant factor, political and economic concerns for Matoaya also spurred the conquests. Additionally, the conquests of Matoaya had precedents in the area long before the rise of Islam, where similar punishments and subjugation status of the defeated states paralleled that of pre-Islamic times.

References

Citations

Bibliography 
 

Early history of Gowa and Talloq
1573 births
1637 deaths